The Close encounter of Cussac is the name given to claims of a close encounter with alien beings by a young brother and sister in Cussac, Cantal, France.

The police noted "sulfur odor and the dried grass" at the place where the sphere was alleged to have taken off. The children's story is one of the reports of UFO sightings investigated by the French government made public in a mass release of documents in March 2007, which received so many hits on its first day that the site crashed.

See also
 UFO sightings in France

References

Further reading 
Report on the Scientific Council - GEPAN, t. 4, National Centre for Space Studies, 140, June 1978 No. 68. 
Thierry Pinvidic, "Witnesses to a" legend ": a case of UFO sighting 'in' Communications', No. 52, October 1990, p. 311-335. 
Thierry Pinvidic, "A classic that has a hard time" in Pinvindic Thiery (ed). 'UFO: towards an anthropology of contemporary myth', Editions Heimdal, Paris, 1993, p. 199-209.

UFO sightings
1967 in France